Kispiox is a Gitxsan (often known also as Gitksan, due to eastern and western dialects) village of approximately 550 in the Kispiox Valley, at the confluence of the Kispiox and Skeena Rivers in British Columbia.

Kispiox is perhaps most known to outsiders for its totem poles, some of which were the subject of Emily Carr paintings in the early 20th century. The totem poles of Kispiox were featured as part of an episode of the 1975 David Attenborough documentary series The Tribal Eye. The episode, "Crooked Beak of Heaven", focused on traditional customs and art of the Gitxsan and neighbouring tribes.

Additionally, the Kispiox River has been host to two world-record steelhead catches: a 33-pounder and a 36-pounder. Kispiox has remained a favorite tourist attraction for its historical village, traditional artifacts and fishing.

The original and traditional name of Kispiox Village is "Anspay'axw", loosely translated from the Gitxsan language; this means "The Hiding Place".

Notable people from Kispiox
Alvin Weget Elder, Hereditary Chief Gitluudahlxw
Walter Harris, O.C., Artist and Gitxsan Hereditary Chief
Delgamuukw Earl Muldoe, Gitxsan Hereditary Chief

References

External links
Gitxsan Chiefs Office
Skeena River Totem Poles
Paintings of Kispiox
Kispiox Valley Homepage
Kispiox Band Reserves

Gitxsan
Skeena Country
Unincorporated settlements in British Columbia